Judo at the 2019 Pacific Games was held on 16–17 July 2019 in Apia, Samoa.

Medal summary

Medal table

Men's events

Women's events

See also
 Judo at the Pacific Games

References

2019
2019 Pacific Games
Pacific Games